George Etienne Ganiere  (April 26, 1865 – 1935) was an American sculptor born in Chicago, Illinois.  There he studied at the Art Institute of Chicago where he eventually became an instructor and then the head of the Sculpture Department.

Ganiere was a member of the National Sculpture Society and exhibited at their 1923 show, held in New York City.

Works
 Anthony Wayne equestrian statue, Fort Wayne, Indiana,  1918

References

1865 births
1935 deaths
20th-century American sculptors
20th-century American male artists
19th-century American sculptors
19th-century American male artists
American male sculptors